Chong Ka-yan (born 24 November 1993) is a Hong Kong rugby union player. She featured at the 2017 Women's Rugby World Cup for Hong Kong as they made their debut.

Biography 
Chong made her sevens debut for Hong Kong at the Qingdao leg of the 2015 Asia Rugby Women's Sevens Series. She was part of the Hong Kong sevens team that competed at the repechage tournament in Monaco in 2021.

References 

1993 births
Living people
Hong Kong people
Hong Kong rugby union players
Hong Kong female rugby union players
Hong Kong female rugby sevens players
Rugby union players at the 2018 Asian Games